The 2022 Boylesports Irish Greyhound Derby took place during August and September 2022, with the final being held on 24 September at Shelbourne Park. The competition was sponsored by BoyleSports and the prize money purse was €300,000, of which €125,000 went to the winner.

The winner was a black dog called Born Warrior, trained and bred by Jennifer O'Donnell and owned by the Whatever-you-like Syndicate. O'Donnell continued the family legacy following on from her father Matt O'Donnell and mother Frances O'Donnell.

The ante post favourites were Ballinabola Ed at 10/1, Good Cody (Irish Sprint champion) and Romeo Magico English Derby champion at 12/1, Vincenzo and Coolavanny Hoffa at 14/1. The 2021 runner-up and finalists Singalong Sally, Explosive Boy and All About Ted were other leading names to compete, as were Priceless Jet, Kirby Memorial champion Swords Rex and Champion Stakes winner One Time Only.

The first round was held on 19 & 20 August, second round on 26 & 27 August, third round on 3 September, quarter finals on 10 September and semi finals on 17 September.

Final result 
At Shelbourne Park (over 550 yards):

Distances 
½, 3, 2½, 2½, 2
 (0.07 sec = one length)

Quarter finals

Semi finals

Competition report
The first round saw Good Cody return the fastest heat win with a 29.25 run and the main eliminations were Swords Rex, Gaston Pecas and Ballymac Fairone.

The second round started with a fast win from Coolavanny Hoffa in 29.13, followed by another Explosive Boy heat win which also resulted in One Time Only being eliminated. Two significant shocks were in heat 3 and the elimination of Singalong Sally and Good Cody fell in heat 8 but English Derby Champion Romeo Magico won heat 4. The second set of heats started with both Hello Hammond and Kildare going out of the competition. All About Ted and Vincenzo both won their heats before Raha Mofo was eliminated and Ballinabola Ed recorded 29.27 (the best of the night).

The third round started with Tullig Raven defeating Explosive Boy in 29.56. Romeo Magico continued his good form taking heat 2 (29.59) before Barefoot Supremo won in 29.66. Callaway Masters won the next heat, which also saw Priceless Jet eliminated and Crafty Kokoro claimed heat 5. The sixth heat looked like the strongest on paper and Owen McKenna completed a double with Callaway Pro Am, the white and white black dog would be the only remaining unbeaten greyhound by the end of the night. Coolavanny Hoffa took second place but both Ballinabola Ed and All About Ted failed to progress. Bockos Budsit won heat 7 and Vincenzo returned the fastest time of the night in the last heat (29.49). 

The first quarter final went to Ballymac Finn in 29.59 but the challenge of Romeo Magico came to an end after the English Derby champion encountered problems at the first and third bends. The next heat went to Coolavanny Hoffa, who once again set the best time of the round in 29.24. Maries Wedding won her first race of the competition by winning heat 3 and Callaway Pro Am remained unbeaten after winning the last heat. 

In the first semi final Callaway Pro Am continued his unbeaten run after a strong run from trap 4, coming from behind he caught and overtook both Born Warrior and Coolavanny Hoffa. The latter was forced to check behind Born Warrior which cost him his place in the competition because Crafty Kokoro finished strongly and denied the favourite a place in the final. The second semi final was missing Vincenzo so only five greyhounds competed. Ballymac Finn took advantage of the red box draw and held of the challenge of his sister Maries Wedding and the strong finishing Droopys Nice One.

In the final Born Warrior produced a surprise win by trapping well and leading all the way, he missed the crowding and held off the unlucky Ballymac Finn, who was invloved in the first bend crowding. Crafty Kokoro was slow away, found trouble but still ran on strongly to claim third place from Callaway Pro Am, the latter unfortunately chose the final to end his five race Derby winning sequence, the trap one draw proved to be his downfall as he moved off at the first bend when in a prominent position. Maries Wedding bumped at the first bend and Droopys Nice One who missed the break were unable to get into the race.

See also 
2022 UK & Ireland Greyhound Racing Year

References 

Greyhound Derby
Irish Greyhound Derby
Irish Greyhound Derby
Greyhound racing competitions in Dublin (city)
Irish Greyhound Derby